The Ranks and insignia of the Imperial Russian Armed Forces were the military ranks used by the Imperial Russian Army and the Imperial Russian Navy. Many of the ranks were derived from the German model. The ranks were abolished following the Russian Revolution, with the Red Army adopting an entirely different system.

Army ranks and rank designation 
The following ranks and their respective insignia were also used by the personnel of the Imperial Russian Air Service from 1912 to 1917.

Army ranks

1698–1716

1716–1722

1722–1731

1731-1765

1765-1798

1798-1800

1800-1826

1826-1884

1884-1917

Other regiments and cadet corps 
The following shoulder board insignias of the Imperial Army used by specific units and cadet corps are illustrated below:

Naval ranks and rank insignia

1696-1706

1706-1713

1713-1717

1717-1722

1722-1732

1732-1751

1751-1758

1758-1764

1764-1798

1798-1827

1827-1884

1884-1907

1907-1911

1911-1917

Sleeve insignia of the Russian Navy from 1917 

By order № 125 of the Navy Ministry of the Russian Provisional Government, from April 16, 1917 was provided:
Abolishment of the hitherto used shoulder rank insignia.
Abolishment of the (naval) scarf.
Deletion of any monogram, or initial letter on weapons and equipment.
Paint over of the cockade center on caps with red color, until availability of the peaked cap with new national emblem.

The traditional shoulder rank insignia were replaced by golden sleeve strips for naval officers, admiralty officers, and naval engineers, as well as – after completion of mandatory examinations – praporshchiks and officers of the hydrographical service.

Silver sleeve strips were introduced to officers of the admiralty staff, before completion of mandatory examinations, as well to ship engineers, officials of the naval administration and naval physicians with officer rank or status.

Both cuff insignias were used in uniforms with the executive curl.

As discrimination criteria to specific appointments or assignments additional corps colours on the lower part of sleeve stripes was determinate:
red = ship engineers;
raspberry coloured = naval administration;
dark blue = hydrographical service;
white = physicians

The table below shows examples of rank insignia of the Russian Navy, to be worn on the lower part of uniform cuffs, as to the order № 125 of the Russian Navy Ministry from April 16, 1917.

See also 
 History of Russian military ranks
 Ranks and insignia of the White Movement
 Ranks and insignia of the Red Army and Navy 1918–1935, ... 1935–1940, and ... 1940–1943
 Ranks and insignia of the Soviet Armed Forces 1943–1955 and ... 1955–1991
 Ranks and insignia of the Russian Federation's armed forces 1994–2010

References 

 
Russian Federation Army